Brendan Guilfoyle (born ) is an Irish rugby league footballer who plays for the Treaty City Titans in the Irish Elite League. He is an Ireland international.

Background
Guilfoyle was born in Kilkenny, Ireland.

Career
He was named in the Ireland training squad for the 2008 Rugby League World Cup.

As of 2011, he is working as a Development Officer with Rugby League Ireland and has remained a part of the Ireland squad.

He played for Ireland in the 2009 European Cup and the 2010 European Cups. In 2009 he appeared against Serbia where he scored a try on début while in 2010 he started in his side's fixture with France.

References

External links
Treaty City Titans profile
Statistics at rugbyleagueproject.org

1984 births
Living people
Ireland national rugby league team players
Irish rugby league players
People from Kilkenny (city)
Rugby league players from County Kilkenny
Rugby articles needing expert attention
Treaty City Titans players